Streptomyces crystallinus is a bacterium species from the genus of Streptomyces. Streptomyces crystallinus produces hygromycin A.

See also 
 List of Streptomyces species

References

Further reading

External links
Type strain of Streptomyces crystallinus at BacDive -  the Bacterial Diversity Metadatabase

crystallinus
Bacteria described in 1961